Deneys Reitz (1882—1944), son of Francis William Reitz, was a Boer warrior who fought in the Second Boer War for the South African Republic against the British Empire. After a period of exile in French Madagascar he returned to South Africa, where he became a lawyer and founded a major South African law firm. In the First World War he fought for the Union of South Africa against the German Empire, and then was an officer in the British Army, commanding several battalions.  In later life he was a politician. Deneys Reitz was educated at Grey College, Bloemfontein.

While in exile in Madagascar, he wrote about his experience of the Second Boer War (1899–1902). When it was eventually edited and published in 1929 as Commando: A Boer Journal of the Boer War, it still had the freshness and detail of an account written soon after the war. The account is unique in that he was present at virtually every major event of the war.

Second Boer War

At the age of 17, while visiting his father in Pretoria, at the start of the Second Boer War, the Field-Cornet's office said he was too young to fight and refused to enlist him. He met his father with the President of the Transvaal, Paul Kruger, who took him straight to the room of the Commandant-General Piet Joubert. Joubert personally handed him a new Mauser carbine and a bandolier of ammunition. He and one of his brothers then joined the Boer forces "by virtue of having thrown our belongings through a carriage window and climbing aboard".

During the initial phase of the War, he fought several battles, including the engagement at Surprise Hill (Vaalkop) and in the Boer victory at Spionkop. After a string of Boer defeats in set-piece warfare and the British capture of Pretoria, Reitz was one of the fighters who remained in the field. He joined General Smuts who decided to conduct guerrilla operations, not in the territories of the Boer republics, but in the Cape Colony. They faced immense difficulties, both from British forces and from nature, and when the majority did break through to the Cape they were on their last legs.

Battle of Elands River

On 17 September 1901, Smuts' commando encountered the 17th Lancers in the vicinity of Tarkastad.  Smuts realised that the Lancers' camp was their one opportunity to re-equip themselves with horses, food and clothing.  A fierce fight, subsequently to be known as the Battle of Elands River, took place, with the Lancers being caught in a cross-fire and suffering heavy casualties.  Stunned by the onslaught, the remaining Lancers put up a white flag.  Reitz encountered Captain Sandeman, the Lancers' commander, and his lieutenant Lord Vivian among the wounded.

In his book Commando, Reitz recounts how Lord Vivian pointed out his bivouac tent and told him it would be worth his while to take a look at it. Soon, Reitz, who that morning had been wearing a grain-bag, riding a foundered horse, and carrying an old Gewehr 1888 rifle with only two rounds of ammunition left, was dressed in a cavalry tunic and riding breeches, with a superb mount, a Lee-Metford sporting rifle, and full bandoliers. Reitz reports that he met Lord Vivian again in London in 1935, on excellent terms.

(Thomas Pakenham, in his introduction to the 1983 Jonathan Ball edition of Commando, reports a more elaborate story. In this touching account, Vivian overcame Reitz's reluctance to take the spoils of victory, and presented Reitz's original rifle to him in London in 1943. As Vivian died in 1940 this is impossible.)

At the end of the war, after remarkable adventures, Smuts' commando had made itself a relatively comfortable base in the west of the Cape Colony and was besieging the garrison of Okiep, Northern Cape.

Defeat and exile

Reitz formed part of the negotiating delegation from his commando, given passage to meet the delegates from the other commandos still in the field. He reports that "nothing could have proved more clearly how nearly the Boer cause was spent than these starving, ragged men clad in skins or sacking, their bodies covered in sores, from lack of salt or food, and their appearance was a great shock to us, who came from the better-conditioned forces in the Cape." Reitz's father was among the signatories of the surrender, but only in his official capacity; he refused to sign himself and was given two weeks to settle his affairs in Pretoria before leaving the country. Deneys felt that he had to stand by his father and so also refused to sign. He left for Madagascar with his brother, where they eked out a living convoying goods by ox-transport "hard work in dank fever-stricken forests and across mountains sodden with eternal rain". In his spare time there he wrote Commando, dated 1903 but not published until 1929.

Return to South Africa, active service, and public life

On the advice of his wartime commander, Jan Smuts, he returned to South Africa in 1906. The malaria he had contracted in Madagascar had so severely affected his health that he collapsed unconscious upon his return to South Africa. He was nursed back to health over three years by Jan Smuts' wife, Isie. He then completed his studies and in 1908 in Heilbron began his successful career as a lawyer. In 1914 he helped Smuts suppress the Maritz Rebellion in the Orange Free State, and he served on Smuts' army staff in the "German West campaign" (in the German colony of German South West Africa) and in the "German East campaign" (in German East Africa) where he rose to command a mounted regiment. On the Western Front during World War I he commanded the First Battalion, Royal Scots Fusiliers in 1918, after being wounded in late 1917 while serving with 6/7th Battalion Royal Scots Fusiliers.  He led his men to the Rhine after the Armistice, as detailed in his book Trekking On.

He joined Smuts' South African Party, becoming the member of the House of Assembly of South Africa for Bloemfontein South, defeating Colin Steyn of the National Party by 101 votes in the first of their three contests for this seat. His principles during his political career included loyalty to General Smuts, loyalty to the British Empire as guarantor of South African freedom, and harmony between Dutch and English South Africans. He opposed the Ossewa Brandwag organisation, which planned to take control of South Africa as soon as Britain had been crushed.

In 1920 he married Leila Agnes Buissiné Wright (Cape Town, 13 December 1887 - Cape Town, 29 December 1959). She was a social reformer, an outspoken advocate of women's rights and suffrage for women, and the first woman member of the Assembly (representative for Parktown in Johannesburg, 1933–1944).

On 3 August 1920, Steyn again stood against him in the same constituency. Reitz won again, this time with a majority of 141. In the general election of 1921, Reitz and Steyn contested Bloemfontein South once more. This time Steyn was returned with a majority of 47.

When the Smuts government fell in 1924, Reitz returned to his law practice. In subsequent years he visited the Kalahari, Kaokoveld, the Belgian Congo and Angola. His last book, No Outspan (1943), describes this period.

The South African Party formed a coalition government with the National Party in 1933, next year establishing the United Party. In this government Reitz accepted the office of minister of agriculture and irrigation, later minister of agriculture. In 1939, he became Minister of Native Affairs and Deputy Prime Minister until 1943, when he was appointed as South African High Commissioner to London, where he served until his death in 1944.

 
The Free State town of Deneysville is named after him. His law firm, Deneys Reitz Inc, became a leader in South Africa, and in 2011 merged with an international law firm.

Published works

Three volumes of an autobiography:
 "Commando: A Boer Journal Of The Boer War", first published in Great Britain in 1929, 
 Trekking On (1933), dealing with the Boer War through World War I, and
 No Outspan (1943), which covers life in South African politics between the wars and concludes with him as Deputy Prime Minister of South Africa.

Also published in one volume:
 "The Trilogy of Deneys Reitz", by Deneys Reitz, Wolfe Publishing Co., 1994 (Reprint), 

Other works:
 "God Does Not Forget: The Story of a Boer War Commando"
 "The Long Way Home"
 "No Outspan"

References

About Reitz

 Martin Bossenbroek: The Boer War (Transl. by Yvette Rosenberg) Auckland Park (S.A.), Jacana, 2015. .

1882 births
1944 deaths
People from Bloemfontein
Afrikaner people
South African Party (Union of South Africa) politicians
United Party (South Africa) politicians
Government ministers of South Africa
Members of the House of Assembly (South Africa)
South African Army officers
Royal Scots Fusiliers officers
South African Republic military personnel of the Second Boer War
South African military personnel of World War I
British Army personnel of World War I
Alumni of Grey College, Bloemfontein
High Commissioners of South Africa to the United Kingdom